Salvador Araneta y Zaragoza (January 31, 1902 – October 7, 1982) was a Filipino nationalist, constitutionalist, politician, civil servant, lawyer, educator, economist, businessman, industrialist, environmentalist, and philanthropist. 

He was a member of the Philippine Constitutional Convention of 1933 and 1971 and founder and twice president of the Philippine Constitution Association. Araneta served as Secretary of Economic Coordination under President Elpidio Quirino, Secretary of Agriculture under President Ramon Magsaysay, and as member of the National Economic Council. He is the second son of Gregorio Araneta y Soriano and Carmen Zaragoza y Roxas.

As an educator, he founded Gregorio Araneta University Foundation, the first private agricultural school after World War II, endowed the university with one sixth of his personal wealth and turned it into a foundation. He also founded FEATI University to train engineers and mechanics for Far Eastern Air Transportation, Inc., the first airline that operated after the war serving China and San Francisco. Araneta pioneered in the flour industry (RFM Corporation), in soy bean extraction (Republic Soya), in the manufacture of electric motors (Feati Industries), animal feeds (AIA Feed Mills), animal vaccines (AIA Biological Laboratories). He was co-founder of NEPA (National Economic Protectionism Association), PRRM (Philippine Rural Reconstruction Movement), and the White Cross, an orphanage.

Araneta dedicated his life to uplift the moral and social values of society and sought property ownership and capitalism for all. These he embodied in a draft constitution, the Bayanikasan Constitution published in 1980 to be adopted in 10 to 20 years.

External links
Don Salvador Z. Araneta
Salvador Araneta

1902 births
1982 deaths
Araneta family
Deaths from diabetes
Filipino educators
People from Negros Occidental
Secretaries of Agriculture of the Philippines
Secretaries of Environment and Natural Resources of the Philippines
Magsaysay administration cabinet members
Quirino administration cabinet members
Filipino company founders
20th-century Filipino lawyers